Chisom Leonard Johnson (born 28 October 1993) is a Dutch football forward.

Club career

AS Trenčín
Johnson made his professional Fortuna Liga debut for AS Trenčín against FC DAC 1904 Dunajská Streda on 13 August 2016.

SC Telstar
In July 2017, Johnson signed with SC Telstar. In the beginning of 2018, Johnson received the message, that he wouldn't play anymore for the club. He was excluded from training by the club, because he no longer fitted into the plans of the club's head coach. Because the club didn't have a reserve team, this exclusion meant that Johnson actually had to sit at home. Johnson did not agree with this course and went to VVSC. After finding no solution, the case was presented to KNVB. The Commission considered the exclusion of Johnson as substantial. Johnson began training again, while Telstar was sentenced a penalty.

References

External links
  AS Trenčín official club profile
 Fortuna Liga profile
 
 Eurofotbal profile
 Futbalnet profile

1993 births
Footballers from Amsterdam
Living people
Dutch footballers
Association football forwards
S.C. Farense players
Nikos & Sokratis Erimis FC players
Karmiotissa FC players
AS Trenčín players
SC Telstar players
Slovak Super Liga players
Eerste Divisie players
Cypriot Second Division players
Expatriate footballers in Portugal
Dutch expatriate sportspeople in Portugal
Expatriate footballers in Cyprus
Dutch expatriate sportspeople in Cyprus
Expatriate footballers in Italy
Dutch expatriate sportspeople in Italy
Expatriate footballers in Slovakia
Dutch expatriate sportspeople in Slovakia
A.S.D. Roccella players